Taman Ria is a very small residential area in Johor Bahru, Johor, Malaysia.

Taman Ria consists of several rows of shops and some double storey terrace houses. Some well-known shops here are Restoran Tepian Ria, Ah Hua Kueh Tiao restaurant, Clinic Ria and an Esso petrol station.

Every Wednesday, a night market or pasar malam is held at the street of Taman Ria, making this small residential area become very busy and noisy.

Johor Bahru
Populated places in Johor